Vic Honour (25 October 1910 – 3 January 2001) was an Australian cricketer. He played in six first-class matches for Queensland in 1935/36.

See also
 List of Queensland first-class cricketers

References

External links
 

1910 births
2001 deaths
Australian cricketers
Cricketers from Buckinghamshire
Queensland cricketers